Michael Aaron Rockland is a writer and Professor of American Studies at Rutgers University. Despite the variety of his books and articles, the recurring interests in his writing—whether scholarship, memoir, journalism or fiction—are New Jersey culture and America on the international stage.

Life and career 
Born in New York City, Rockland attended Hunter College. Upon graduation, he was drafted into the U.S. Navy and served two years in Yokosuka, Japan as a medic working in a locked psychiatric ward for American military personnel. This experience gave rise to his memoir, Navy Crazy.

Honorably discharged in 1957, he began work on his Masters and Ph.D. in American Studies at the University of Minnesota. He was then attracted to government by John F. Kennedy.
Entering the diplomatic service in 1961, Rockland served seven years, including two with the American embassy in Argentina as a cultural officer and four with the embassy in Spain as both a cultural officer and Director of the Casa Americana.

Leaving the diplomatic service in 1968 because of differences over the Vietnam War, he accepted a position in New Jersey as Executive Assistant to the Chancellor of Higher Education. Rutgers University then hired him as a dean whose main function would be negotiating peace between an increasingly rebellious, anti-Vietnam student body and faculty and the state legislature.

After several years as a dean, he gave up administration, became a professor, and has ever since alternated between writing for scholarly and general audiences.

New Jersey culture 
Four of Rockland's books and a movie focus on New Jersey. The first, which he co-authored, was Looking for America on the New Jersey Turnpike. The book documented the Turnpike as "the purest expression of a distinctly American industrial esthetic".

Snowshoeing Through Sewers included stories such as "Afoot in New Jersey", about an ambulatory pilgrimage he made across the state. The author urges such urban adventures "through our own habitat" as equal to the traditional wilderness based ones.
The book, with ten such adventures, followed the PBS-funded movie, Three Days on Big City Waters, which concerned two Rutgers professors who paddled across New Jersey until they land among the ruins of Ellis Island and, eventually, reach Manhattan. Rockland co-wrote the script for this film and acted the role of one of the professors.

Another New Jersey-oriented book, ethnically oriented and co-written, was titled The Jews of New Jersey: A Pictorial History.

He was moved to write The George Washington Bridge: Poetry in Steel, an "affectionate history" of the bridge, when discovering that there had been countless books on the Brooklyn Bridge, while there had never been one on the George Washington. The George Washington is still the busiest bridge in the world, and he considered it equal in importance to the Brooklyn from an historical, engineering, and aesthetic perspective.

Rockland has been interviewed about these books on NPR, PBS, and other national and international media. All of Rockland's New Jersey writings argue for the importance of the state, contradicting its many critics who often regard it as a national joke. Robert Pirsig, author of the classic, Zen and the Art of Motorcycle Maintenance, wrote about one of his New Jersey-oriented works, "Rockland isn't just observing ... he's in it all the way, fighting the old cliquès."

In addition to his books, Rockland has written some sixty feature stories on New Jersey for the Sunday New York Times, for several general circulation magazines, but especially for New Jersey Monthly magazine, for which he is a contributing writer. Rockland also wrote the article in the Encyclopedia of New Jersey on New Jersey's image.

Rockland pioneered the term and the course "Jerseyana" at Rutgers University and served for years as the cultural commentator on PBS's New Jersey Nightly News.

He has long argued for dropping New Jersey's nickname "The Garden State" (a misnomer for America's most densely populated state), in favor of the "Bill of Right's State", since New Jersey was first to ratify the first ten amendments to the Constitution.

America on the international stage 

As already suggested, Rockland's interest in America and the international scene began during his diplomatic career. His first book, Sarmiento's Travels in the United States in 1847, concerned the Argentine President, Domingo Faustino Sarmiento, and his friendship with Americans such as Ralph Waldo Emerson, Henry Wadsworth Longfellow, and Horace Mann, about which virtually nothing had been known before. In this book he argued that the United States had all but ignored its sister nations of the hemisphere and that the time had come for Americans to "look South."

Rockland next edited America in the Fifties and Sixties: Julián Marías on the United States, after Marías, then Spain's leading living philosopher, recruited him to take on this project.

Rockland's years in Spain were the inspiration for a memoir, An American Diplomat in Franco Spain. The memoir includes chapters on days Rockland spent essentially alone with Martin Luther King and Senator Edward Kennedy in Madrid, as well as the embassy's involvement in an infamous Cold War incident where the United States accidentally dropped four unarmed hydrogen bombs on Spain.

Much of the action in Rockland's first novel, A Bliss Case, takes place in and concerns India. The New York Times called it "written with a light touch and a near-perfect ear for humbug".

Regardless of the literary form he employs, Rockland is a strong proponent of writing and teaching about the United States from a transnational perspective. He has been aided in this endeavor through invitations to lecture abroad in numerous countries.

Awards and honors 

Being awarded four Fulbright fellowships—to Argentina, Uruguay, Peru, and Norway—has also enhanced his transnationally oriented focus. Other awards have included the Mary C. Turpie National Teaching Award in American Studies in 1997 and the Scholar-Teacher Award of Rutgers University in 2003.

Rockland's book, Sarmiento's Travels in the United States in 1847 was chosen by The Washington Post as one of the "Fifty Best Books of the Year". Similarly, his novel, A Bliss Case, was chosen by The New York Times as one of the "Fifty Notable Books of the Year".

Rockland's long career writing and teaching about New Jersey was recognized in 2013 when he received the Governor Richard J. Hughes Award from the New Jersey Historical Commission for "lifetime achievement and contributions to New Jersey history".

Major works

Scholarship 
 Sarmiento's Travels in the United States in 1847 (1970) Princeton UP
 America in the Fifties and Sixties: Julián Marías on the United States (1972) Penn. State UP
 The American Jewish Experience in Literature (1975). University of Haifa
 Homes on Wheels (1980). Rutgers UP
 Looking for America on the New Jersey Turnpike (1989). With Angus Kress Gillespie. Rutgers UP
 What's American About American Things? (1996). University of Leon
 Popular Culture: Or Why Study Trash? (1999). University of Leon
 The Jews of New Jersey: A Pictorial History (2002). With Patricia Ard. Rutgers UP
 The George Washington Bridge: Poetry in Steel (2008) Rutgers UP

Memoir 
 Snowshoeing Through Sewers (1994) Rutgers UP
 An American Diplomat in Franco Spain (2012) University of Valencia 92011); Hansen Publishing (2012)
 Navy Crazy (2014) Hansen Publishing

Fiction 
 A Bliss Case (1989). Coffee House Press
 Stones (2009) Hansen Publishing

Screenplay 
 Three Days on Big City Waters (1974). With Charles Woolfolk. Producer-Director, Clark Santee. P.B.S.

References

External links 
 11/29/2012 discussion by author of An American Diplomat in Spain (http://www.c-span.org/video/?309704-1/book-discussion-american-diplomat-franco-spain)
 11/2/2014 discussion by author of Navy Crazy (http://www.c-span.org/video/?322612-1/book-discussion-navy-crazy)

Rutgers University faculty
Hunter College alumni
University of Minnesota College of Liberal Arts alumni
American artists
Living people
1935 births